Luděk Macela (3 October 1950 – 16 June 2016) was a Czech football player. He played eight matches for the Czechoslovakia national football team.

He was a participant in the 1980 Olympic Games, where Czechoslovakia won the gold medal.

Macela played mostly for Dukla Prague and won the Czechoslovak First League three times with them, in 1977, 1979 and 1982.

References

External links
 

1950 births
2016 deaths
Czech footballers
Czechoslovak footballers
Czechoslovakia international footballers
Dukla Prague footballers
SV Darmstadt 98 players
Footballers at the 1980 Summer Olympics
Medalists at the 1980 Summer Olympics
Olympic gold medalists for Czechoslovakia
Olympic footballers of Czechoslovakia
Olympic medalists in football
Czechoslovak expatriate footballers
Expatriate footballers in West Germany
2. Bundesliga players
Czechoslovak expatriate sportspeople in West Germany
Association football defenders
People from Prague-West District
Sportspeople from the Central Bohemian Region